This is a list of cases reported in volume 302 of United States Reports, decided by the Supreme Court of the United States in 1937 and 1938.

Justices of the Supreme Court at the time of volume 302 U.S. 

The Supreme Court is established by Article III, Section 1 of the Constitution of the United States, which says: "The judicial Power of the United States, shall be vested in one supreme Court . . .". The size of the Court is not specified; the Constitution leaves it to Congress to set the number of justices. Under the Judiciary Act of 1789 Congress originally fixed the number of justices at six (one chief justice and five associate justices). Since 1789 Congress has varied the size of the Court from six to seven, nine, ten, and back to nine justices (always including one chief justice).

When the cases in volume 302 were decided the Court comprised the following nine members:

Notable Cases in 302 U.S.

Bogardus v. Commissioner of Internal Revenue
In Bogardus v. Commissioner of Internal Revenue,  302 U.S. 34 (1937), the Supreme Court held that a distribution of money by a corporation to the company's past and present employees who had no current ties with the corporation, in recognition of their past service, was a non-taxable gift and not "compensation for personal services".

James, State Tax Commissioner v. Dravo Contracting Company
In James, State Tax Commissioner v. Dravo Contracting Company,  302 U.S. 134 (1937), the Supreme Court held that a state's corporate income tax did not violate the Supremacy Clause (Article Six, Clause 2) of the United States Constitution by taxing the Federal government of the United States.  It was the first time the Court had upheld a tax on the federal government. The decision is considered a landmark in the field of federal tax immunity, underpins modern legal interpretations of the Supremacy Clause in the U.S. Constitution, and established the "legal incidence test" for tax cases.

Puerto Rico v. Shell Company (P.R.), Ltd.
Puerto Rico v. Shell Company (P.R.), Ltd.,  302 U.S. 253 (1937), is a notable Supreme Court of the United States case.  The issue was whether a local ("insular") law could be pre-empted by the Commerce clause of the United States Constitution.  It was also notable as being one of the first cases that determined that Puerto Rico can be treated as if a state for some purposes under the law.  It has become a precedent for similar cases.

Palko v. Connecticut
Palko v. Connecticut,  302 U.S. 319 (1937) involved a murder conviction. Palko had been charged with first-degree murder but was instead convicted of the lesser offense of second-degree murder and was given a sentence of life imprisonment.  Prosecutors appealed per Connecticut law and won a new trial in which Palko was found guilty of first-degree murder and sentenced to death. Palko then appealed, arguing that the Fifth Amendment protection against double jeopardy applied to state governments through the Due Process Clause of the Fourteenth Amendment. The Court had previously held, in the Slaughterhouse cases, that the protections of the Bill of Rights should not be applied to the states under the Privileges or Immunities clause, but Palko argued that since the infringed right fell under a due process protection, Connecticut still acted in violation of the Fourteenth Amendment. On appeal, the Supreme Court held that the Due Process Clause protected only those rights that were "of the very essence of a scheme of ordered liberty" and that the court should therefore incorporate the Bill of Rights onto the states gradually, as justiciable violations arose, based on whether the infringed right met that test. Applying the subjective case-by-case approach (known as selective incorporation), the Court upheld Palko's conviction on the basis that the double jeopardy appeal was not "essential to a fundamental scheme of ordered liberty." In 1969 the Court overruled Palko by incorporating the protection against double jeopardy with its ruling in Benton v. Maryland.

Leitch Manufacturing Company v. Barber Company
In Leitch Manufacturing Company v. Barber Company,  302 U.S. 458 (1938), the Supreme Court extended the tie-in patent misuse doctrine to cases in which the patentee does not use an explicit tie-in license but instead relies on grants of implied licenses to only those who buy a necessary supply from it.

Federal court system 

Under the Judiciary Act of 1789 the federal court structure at the time comprised District Courts, which had general trial jurisdiction; Circuit Courts, which had mixed trial and appellate (from the US District Courts) jurisdiction; and the United States Supreme Court, which had appellate jurisdiction over the federal District and Circuit courts—and for certain issues over state courts. The Supreme Court also had limited original jurisdiction (i.e., in which cases could be filed directly with the Supreme Court without first having been heard by a lower federal or state court). There were one or more federal District Courts and/or Circuit Courts in each state, territory, or other geographical region.

The Judiciary Act of 1891 created the United States Courts of Appeals and reassigned the jurisdiction of most routine appeals from the district and circuit courts to these appellate courts. The Act created nine new courts that were originally known as the "United States Circuit Courts of Appeals." The new courts had jurisdiction over most appeals of lower court decisions. The Supreme Court could review either legal issues that a court of appeals certified or decisions of court of appeals by writ of certiorari. On January 1, 1912, the effective date of the Judicial Code of 1911, the old Circuit Courts were abolished, with their remaining trial court jurisdiction transferred to the U.S. District Courts.

List of cases in volume 302 U.S. 

[a] Hughes took no part in the case
[b] Black took no part in the case
[c] Stone took no part in the case
[d] Sutherland took no part in the case
[e] Cardozo took no part in the case
[f] Roberts took no part in the case
[g] Brandeis took no part in the case

Notes and references

External links
  Case reports in volume 302 from Library of Congress
  Case reports in volume 302 from Court Listener
  Case reports in volume 302 from the Caselaw Access Project of Harvard Law School
  Case reports in volume 302 from Google Scholar
  Case reports in volume 302 from Justia
  Case reports in volume 302 from Open Jurist
 Website of the United States Supreme Court
 United States Courts website about the Supreme Court
 National Archives, Records of the Supreme Court of the United States
 American Bar Association, How Does the Supreme Court Work?
 The Supreme Court Historical Society